Austrazenia is a genus of moths of the family Noctuidae.

Species
 Austrazenia pura (Swinhoe, 1902)
 Austrazenia tusa (Swinhoe, 1902)

References
 Austrazenia at Markku Savela's Lepidoptera and Some Other Life Forms
 Natural History Museum Lepidoptera genus database

Acronictinae